Protiofate is a drug that has   antimycotic activity  and used in gynecology to treat yeast infections.

References 

Thiophenes
Diketones